Jining Qufu Airport  is an airport serving the cities of Jining and Qufu, the hometown of Confucius, in Shandong Province, China. The airport is located 25 kilometers west of downtown Jining.

Airlines and destinations

See also
List of airports in China

References

External links
Official website

Airports in Shandong
Transport in Jining